Gharibabad (also Romanized as Gharībābād) is a village in Bahu Kalat Rural District, Dashtiari District, Chabahar County, Sistan and Baluchestan Province, Iran. At the 2006 census, its population was 35, in 6 families.

References 

Populated places in Chabahar County